The Ummah Party is a political party of Indonesia. The party formation was announced on 1 October 2020 and declared on 29 April 2021.

The party was founded by former Chairman of the National Mandate Party's Advisory Board, Amien Rais. Amien, an Islamic modernist-turned-Islamic conservatist, became Chairman after an internal rift in the party over support for Jokowi's administration. 

The party aimed to attract Islamic populists, whose presence heightened during the Aksi Bela Islam period. The party, despite claiming to be a "Pancasila-based party", recruited many notable Islamic right-wing figures within their rank and carried out Islamic right-wing agendas. 

Ansufri Idrus Sambo, former "Spiritual Teacher" of Prabowo Subianto, leader of Garda 212 and former Presidium Alumni 212 leader, is one of the many Indonesian Islamic right-wing figures who joined the party. The Garda 212 is an unofficial political tool intended for Aksi Bela Islam alumni, but succeeded in providing channels and support for the alumni to become legislative candidates during 2019 Indonesian general election. The organization is also notable for launching numerous Islamic populist themed conspiracy theories, including one which claimed that the 2018 Surabaya bombings were a false flag attack.

February 2022 crackdown 
In 10 February 2022 at 9:15 AM, a cadre of Ummah Party branch of the Bengkulu province was captured by Densus 88 for allegations of terrorism. It was found that he declared allegiance to Jemaah Islamiyah (JI) since 1999 and was a direct disciple of Abu Bakar Ba'asyir and Abdullah Sungkar back in 1993. Spokesman for Ummah Party, Mustofa Nahrawardaya proposed the government to evaluate the working procedures of Densus 88 in order to not become a terror among the public. Ummah Party also gives legal assistance for its captured member and stated that the party will never deactivate his member status. The captured member was member of Indonesian Ulema Council Bengkulu branch. He was captured along with another member of the council. The capture further added the list of uncovered of JI agents which spread to legal political party and state-sponsored religious agency. While the party defending its captured member, the capture was praised by the National Mandate Party, Nasdem, and Indonesian Solidarity Party. The unusual move of Ummah Party also attract attention of social activist Islah Bahrawi. He further accused that the Ummah Party is a terror organization disguised as a political party or a front organization housing terrorist activity, citing a JI issued work in which in the work become the reference for JI agents. The work stated that to succeed their "long-term struggle strategy" they must implant their agents and cadres to sit in strategic positions in government, political and religious organizations, and businesses in hope facilitating the establishment of Islamic state in Indonesia.

References 

Political parties in Indonesia
Political parties established in 2021
Islamic political parties in Indonesia